Piero Antonio Vivanco Ayala (born 17 January 2000) is a Peruvian footballer who plays as a midfielder for Universidad San Martín on loan from Chilean Primera División side Huachipato.

Career statistics

Club

Notes

References

2000 births
Living people
Peruvian footballers
Peruvian expatriate footballers
Association football midfielders
Esther Grande footballers
C.D. Huachipato footballers
Club Deportivo Universidad de San Martín de Porres players
Chilean Primera División players
Peruvian expatriate sportspeople in Chile
Expatriate footballers in Chile